Pogunon Community Museum is a museum located at Pogunon Village in Penampang District of Sabah, Malaysia.

History 
During the construction of a village kindergarten building in Pogunon in 2000, several ancient artefacts comprising three whole jars, pieces of four jars of blue and white plates including bowls were accidentally unearthed. Inside the three jars were human remains with ceramics found in the site were originated from China and made between the 16th to 19th centuries. A further thirteen ancient burial jars were also unearthed from an old graveyard in front of a St Joseph Chapel in the same village. One of the broken jars consisted of human bones and various artefacts such as coins dating back to 1885, a bangle and belt made from ancient silver coins were also found in the jar which however was broken by an excavator during the discovery. The area with stone markers (megaliths) is located in the front site of the recent museum which established in 2004.

Features 
Three large pots with human skeletal remains are being showcased inside the museum to visitors. Several other potteries discovered on Pogunon were kept by Sabah Museum due to size constraints at the community museum.

See also 
 List of museums in Malaysia

References

External links 
 

Museums established in 2004
Museums in Sabah
Penampang District